Winter Miller (born 1973) is an American playwright and journalist. In the summer of 2007, a reading (directed by Joanna Settle) of Miller's play In Darfur was at the Delacorte Theater in New York City.

Miller was formerly the assistant to Nicholas D. Kristof, a columnist of The New York Times, and is now a reporter on the Times 's Metropolitan news desk. She has also written for the weekly Arts and Leisure, Style, daily Culture and Obituary pages of the Times.

In Darfur
In Darfur was developed by The Guthrie Theater, The Public Theater, Geva Theater, and The Playwrights' Center. The play was based on interviews conducted by Miller and Kristof at the Sudan border with genocide survivors.

Personal
Miller is a 1995 graduate of Smith College and has an M.F.A. from Columbia University.

Partial bibliography

Plays
 In Darfur (2006)
 The Penetration Play (2004)
 Conspicuous
 Something's Wrong With Amandine
 Cake and Ice Cream
 No One is Forgotten

Journalism
 "The Rev. Calvin O. Pressley, 69; Urged Clergy to Reach Out." The New York Times, 27 September 2007.
 "Just Another Medieval Quartet Crossing Over." The New York Times, 13 September 2006.
 "A NIGHT OUT WITH: 'Saturday Night Live' Cast Members; The New Wild and Crazy Guys." The New York Times, 5 February 2006.
 "A NIGHT OUT WITH: Samantha Bee; Joking for Two." The New York Times, 13 November 2005.
 "THEATER: Hey, Look Them Over: The Digital Head Shot Is Here." The New York Times, 23 October 2005.
 "THEATER: Beyond Cute Boys in Their Underpants." The New York Times, 7 August 2005.

Notes

External links
 Winter Miller, Playwright

1973 births
Living people
Smith College alumni
Columbia University School of the Arts alumni
The New York Times writers
American lesbian writers
People from Greenfield, Massachusetts
American women journalists
American women dramatists and playwrights
21st-century American journalists
21st-century American dramatists and playwrights
21st-century American women writers
Journalists from Massachusetts